Alun Edward Islwyn Pask (10 September 1937 – 1 November 1995) was a  international rugby union player and captain.

Pask was capped twenty-six times by Wales between 1961 and 1967, twenty-three times as a flanker and three times as at number eight. He scored two tries for Wales, the first on his international debut and toured South Africa with Wales in 1964. He captained Wales in six internationals and led the side to victory in the 1966 Five Nations Championship. He was selected for the 1962 British Lions tour to South Africa, playing in three of the four internationals against , and the 1966 British Lions tour to Australia and New Zealand where he played in both tests against  and three of the four against New Zealand.

He played club rugby for Abertillery.

References

1937 births
1995 deaths
Abertillery RFC players
Alumni of Loughborough University
Barbarian F.C. players
British & Irish Lions rugby union players from Wales
Loughborough Students RUFC players
Monmouthshire County RFC players
Rugby union flankers
Rugby union number eights
Rugby union players from Blackwood, Caerphilly
Wales international rugby union players
Wales rugby union captains
Welsh rugby union players